Spanish River may refer to:

 Spanish River (Alabama)
 Spanish River (Florida), a river in Boca Raton, Florida
 Spanish River (Jamaica)
 Spanish River (Ontario), a major river in Northern Ontario